Mario Berrios may refer to:

Mario Esteban Berríos (born 1981), Chilean footballer
Mario René Berrios (born 1982), Honduran footballer
Mario Berrios (gymnast), Peruvian who participated in Gymnastics at the 2011 Pan American Games – Men's artistic qualification